Jean-François Borel (born 4 July 1933 in Antwerp, Belgium) is a Belgian microbiologist and immunologist who is considered one of the discoverers of cyclosporin.

Early life 
Borel studied at the University of Antwerp and the ETH Zurich, where he received his doctorate in immunological genetics in 1964. Afterwards he was at the Swiss Research Institute of Medicine. From 1970 he was in the research laboratories of Sandoz in Basel.

Discovery of cyclosporin 

In 1972, Borel was involved in the discovery of the immunosuppressive effects of cyclosporin (Sandoz called Sandimmun), which was isolated by Sandoz in 1971 from a fungus that a Sandoz employee brought back from vacation in Norway. The screening program at Sandoz was previously developed by K. Saameli (and Stähelin) and the immunological testing procedures of S. Lazary. Initially, use as an antibiotic was considered. When it was realized that the substance had only T-cells and therefore had potential in transplantation medicine, Borel aroused much attention in 1976 at a congress in London. In the practice of organ transplantation, the new drug was tested in 1977 by the British surgeon Roy Yorke Calne.

In 1983, Borel became vice president of the pharmaceutical division of Sandoz (later Novartis). Since 1981 he was Professor of Immunopharmacology at the University of Bern.

Also involved in the discovery and development was Hartmann Stähelin, head of the Pharmacology Department at Sandoz, which included the Immunology Department, and later there was a dispute over their respective shares in the discovery.

Awards 

 1984: Cloëtta Prize
 1985: J. Allyn Taylor International Prize in Medicine
 1986: Gairdner Foundation International Award
 1987: Paul Ehrlich and Ludwig Darmstaedter Prize 
 1993: InBev-Baillet Latour Health Prize
 1991 he became an honorary doctor in Basel.

See also 
Organ transplantation

References 

1933 births
Living people
Belgian pharmacologists